The 2006 BCR Open Romania was a men's tennis tournament played on outdoor clay courts. It was the 14th edition of the event known that year as the BCR Open Romania, and was part of the International Series of the 2006 ATP Tour. It took place at the Arenele BNR in Bucharest, Romania, from 11 September through 17 September 2006. Unseeded Jürgen Melzer won the singles title.

Finals

Singles

 Jürgen Melzer defeated  Filippo Volandri, 6–1, 7–5
 It was Melzer's first singles win of his career.

Doubles

 Mariusz Fyrstenberg /  Marcin Matkowski defeated  Martín García /  Luis Horna, 6–7(5–7), 7–6(7–5), [10–8]

References

External links
 ITF tournament edition details

Romanian Open
BCR Open Romania
BCR Open Romania
BCR Open Romania